The 12th Street Bridge is an automobile crossing of the Kansas River in Kansas City, Kansas.

History
The 12th Street Bridge dates back to the early 1900s, when it was an iron bridge. Swept away by a 1903 flood, it was rebuilt at the cost of $75,000. A judge ordered the bridge rebuilt again in 1923 and it was reopened April 22, 1926.

A 1940 fire damaged the center span of the bridge and its wooden floor fell into the river. In about a year, it reopened after being rebuilt.

In 2000, the thru-truss was removed and replaced with a girder, due to problems with the substructure. It is just west of the 7th Street Trafficway Bridge, and east of the 18th Street Expressway Bridge over the Kansas River.

References

Bridges over the Kansas River
Bridges in Kansas City, Kansas
Bridges completed in 1909
Bridges completed in 2000
Road bridges in Kansas
Girder bridges in the United States
1909 establishments in Kansas